High Meadow is a   Local Nature Reserve on the western outskirts of Dover in Kent. It is owned by Dover Town Council and managed by The White Cliffs Countryside Partnership. It was declared a Local Nature Reserve in 2006.

This hilltop meadow has views in all directions. It is grazed by konik horses, which help to preserve the variety of plants and animals. Flora include fragrant, common spotted and pyramidal orchids.

There are several entrances including from Edred Road and steep steps from Coombe Valley Road.

References

Local Nature Reserves in Kent
Protected areas established in 2006
2006 establishments in England